Star Comics is an Italian comic book publisher founded in December 1987 that publishes Italian editions of manga and Italian comics in Italy. Until the establishment of Marvel Italia (now an imprint of Panini Comics) in 1994, it also published Italian editions of many Marvel Comics's comic books. Star Comics has twenty-eight publishing branches and as of 2007 has published a total of 316 manga series in Italy.

Publishing Branches
 Action
 Amici
 Anime comics
 Dragon
 Dragon Quest
 Express
 Fan
 Ghost
 Greatest
 Gundam universe
 Hot
 Kappa extra
 Kappa magazine
 Kappa magazine speciale
 KM Presenta
 Must
 Mitico
 Neverland
 Point break
 Shot
 Starlight
 Storie di kappa
 Techno
 Turn over
 Up
 Up Speciale
 Young
 Zero
 Albi fuoriserie

External links
 Star Comics home page

Comic book publishing companies of Italy
Manga distributors
Companies based in Perugia